Helferich is a surname of German origin, being a variant of the name Helfrich. Notable people with the surname include:

Burckhardt Helferich (1887-1982), German chemist
Heinrich Helferich (1851-1945), German surgeon
Matthias Helferich (born 1988), German politician

See also
Helferich method (disambiguation)
Helfrich
Helfferich